Ashok Kumar (born 24 November 1958) was a Member of the Jammu and Kashmir Legislative Assembly for Ramban. He was elected in the 2008 Jammu and Kashmir Legislative Assembly election and served one term. His political party is the Indian National Congress.

References

1958 births
Living people
Indian National Congress politicians from Jammu and Kashmir
Jammu and Kashmir MLAs 2008–2014